Gaspard Mermillod (22 September 1824 – 23 February 1892) was a Swiss Cardinal of the Roman Catholic Church. Despite a lengthy investiture conflict with the Calvinist Canton of Geneva, he served as Bishop of Lausanne and Geneva from 1883 to 1891, having previously served as Titular Bishop of Hebron. He was made a cardinal in 1890.

He made major contributions to Catholic social teaching which helped lay the groundwork for Leo XIII's encyclical Rerum novarum.

Early life and education
Gaspard Mermillod was born on September 22, 1824, in Carouge, Switzerland. He was the eldest of six children of Jacques Mermillod and Mermillod (née Mégard) Mermillod, both born of farming families of a neighboring village of Bardonnex. His parents operated an inn and a bakery. Gaspard attended the minor Seminary of Saint-Louis du Mont (1837-1841) at Chambéry, France and studied philosophy and theology at the Jesuit Collège Saint-Michel (1841-1847) at Fribourg, Switzerland.

Priesthood
In June 1847, Gaspard was ordained to the priesthood and was appointed curate in Geneva, where he established two periodicals: L'observateur Catholique and Les Annales Catholiques. In 1857, he became a parish priest and at the same time, Vicar-General of the Bishop of Lausanne for the canton of Geneva. The Church of Notre-Dame in Geneva was built by him from 1851 to 1859.

Episcopal career (Catholic church)

Auxiliary Bishop of Lausanne and Geneva
Gaspard was appointed Auxiliary Bishop of the Diocese of Lausanne and Geneva and Titular Bishop of Hebron, by Pope Pius IX, on September 22, 1864. He received his episcopal consecration on the September 25, 1864. He was especially active for Catholic education, founding with Blessed Fr. Louis Brisson and Saint Léonie Aviat the Oblate Sisters of St. Francis de Sales at Troyes, for the protection of poor working girls. On October 30, 1868, Leonie with one of her former boarding school companions, received the habit of this new congregation from Bishop Mermillod.

In 1873, Bishop Etienne Marilley of Lausanne and Geneva, renounced the title of the See of Geneva, in the Calvinist Canton of Geneva. With that action, the Holy See, Pius IX, appointed Bishop Gaspard as Vicar-Apostolic of Geneva, thus officially detaching the Canton of Geneva from the Diocese of Lausanne and Geneva and making it territory directly under the Papal Authority. As this was not recognized by either the State Council of Geneva or the Swiss Federal Council, Bishop Gaspard was forbidden to exercise any episcopal functions and was banished from Switzerland by a decree of February 17, 1873. He then attempted to perform his functions from exile in the nearby French town of Ferney. After the Holy See condemned his banishment, the government responded on December 12, 1873 by expelling the papal nuncio.

In 1879 Bishop Marilley resigned his diocese of Lausanne, and Monsignor Christophore Cosandey, provost at the Seminary in Fribourg, was elected Bishop to a re-unified Diocese of Lausanne and Geneva, while the newly elected Pope Leo XIII ended the Vicariate Apostolic of Geneva. Appeased, the Canton of Geneva lifted its decree against Mermillod.

Bishop of Lausanne and Geneva
Upon the death of Bishop Cosandey in October 1882, Gaspard returned to Switzerland and was appointed Bishop of Lausanne and Geneva on March 15, 1883. The conflict was by no means at an end, for the Canton of Geneva refused to recognize him as bishop. Normal relations resumed only when Leo XIII elevated Gaspard to Cardinal-Priest of Santi Nereo ed Achilleo on June 23, 1890.

Bishop Gaspard made major contributions to the Social Doctrine of the Church. Encouraged by his friend René de La Tour du Pin, he founded the Union of Fribourg, which included some of the biggest names in Social Catholicism at the time (Swiss: Gaspard Decurtins; French: René de La Tour du Pin, Albert de Mun, Louis Milcent, and Henri Lorin; Austrian: Karl von Vogelsang and Gustave Blome;  German: Franz Kuefstein). Their work on the "social question" form the base of the encyclical of Leo XIII, Rerum novarum.

Retirement and death
In March 1891, Cardinal Mermillod resigned the pastoral government of the Diocese of Lausanne and Geneva, and Monsignor Joseph Déruaz was named his successor. Upon this resignation, he relocated to Rome, where he eventually died on February 23, 1892. He was laid in repose, in the church of Ss. Vicenzo ed Anastasio a Trevi and buried in the Carthusian Chapel, Campo Verano Cemetery, Rome. His body was eventually transferred, in 1926, to the parish church of Saint-Croix in Carouge. A street in the town of Carouge was named in his honour.

Works
His Lettres à un Protestant sur l'autorité de l'église et le schisme (Paris, 1860) made a great impression. Another important work was his "De la vie surnaturelle dans les ames" (Lyons, 1865; Paris, 1881). His collected works were edited by Grospellier (Paris, 1893) in three volumes.

See also
Etsi multa

References

External links
 
 
 Catholic Encyclopedia article
  

1824 births
1892 deaths
19th-century Roman Catholic bishops in Switzerland
Swiss cardinals
Cardinals created by Pope Leo XIII
People from Carouge
19th-century Swiss Roman Catholic theologians